Eurypteryx molucca is a moth of the  family Sphingidae. It is known from the Philippines (Mindoro), the Moluccas and Papua New Guinea.

It is easily distinguished from all other Eurypteryx species by the conspicuous off-white patch on the forewing upperside near the apex.

References

Eurypteryx
Moths described in 1874